Suttipong Laoporn, simply known as K, is a Thai former footballer who played as a forward.

Match fixing scandal and ban
On February 21, 2017, Suttipong was accused of match-fixing on several league games. He was arrested by the Royal Thai Police and banned from football for life. He was later sentenced to a prison term of two years on March 18, 2021 by the Criminal Court.

References

External links
ราชนาวีเสริมคม!ซิวสุทธิพงษ์ร่วมทัพ
เสริมคม! นาวีคว้า สุทธิพงษ์ ดาวซัลโวมาบตาพุดล่าตาข่าย
Players Profile - Thai Premier League
ไทย - S. Laoporn - Profile with news, career statistics and history - Soccerway

Living people
1990 births
Suttipong Laoporn
Suttipong Laoporn
Suttipong Laoporn
Association football forwards
Suttipong Laoporn
Match fixers